The 2023 Premier Volleyball League All-Filipino Conference is the fourteenth conference of the Premier Volleyball League and its fifth conference as a professional league. The tournament began on February 4, 2023, at the Smart Araneta Coliseum, Quezon City.

Formerly known as the Open Conference, the conference was rebranded as the "All-Filipino Conference" to better reflect the fact that the tournament's participation is restricted to Filipino players, including Filipino-Foreigners.

Participating teams

Venues 

This conference eyes hosting games again outside of Metro Manila such as in Lucena City, Iloilo City, and Cagayan de Oro, just like what they did last 2019. As of February 3, the league is set to arrange games in Iloilo City on March 14.

Transactions

National team players 
The following players  that played in the 2022 Asian Women's Volleyball Cup and the 2022 ASEAN Grand Prix are solely composed of the players from Creamline Cool Smashers.

Team additions and transfers 
The following are the players who transferred to another team for the upcoming conference.

Format 
Originally, the semifinals format is single round-robin tournament. However, the league reverts to its most used format — a crossover best-of-3 series between the 1st and 4th, and 2nd and 3rd ranked teams.
Preliminary Round
 The nine teams will compete in a single round-robin elimination.
 Teams are ranked using the FIVB Ranking System.
 Top four teams will advance to the semifinals.
Semifinals
 Best-of-three series.
 1st ranked team vs. 4th ranked team
 2nd ranked team vs. 3rd ranked team
Finals
 Best-of-three series.
 Bronze medal: SF1 Loser vs. SF2 Loser
 Gold medal: SF1 Winner vs. SF2 Winner

Pool standing procedure 
 Number of matches won
 Match points
 Sets ratio
 Points ratio
 If the tie continues as per the point ratio between two teams, the priority will be given to the team which won the last match between them. When the tie in points ratio is between three or more teams, a new classification of these teams in the terms of points 1, 2 and 3 will be made taking into consideration only the matches in which they were opposed to each other.

Match won 3–0 or 3–1: 3 match points for the winner, 0 match points for the loser
Match won 3–2: 2 match points for the winner, 1 match point for the loser.

Preliminary round 
 All times are Philippine Standard Time (UTC+8:00).

Ranking 

|}

Match results 
|}

Final round 
 All times are Philippine Standard Time (UTC+8:00).
 All are best-of-three series.

Semifinals 
Rank 1 vs rank 4
 

|}

Rank 2 vs rank 3
|}

Finals

3rd place 
|}

Championship 
|}

Awards and medalists

Individual awards

Medalists

Final standings

Statistics leaders

Preliminary round 
Statistics leaders correct at the end of the preliminary round.

Best scorers

Best spikers

Best blockers

Best servers

Best diggers

Best setters

Best receivers

See also 
 2023 Spikers' Turf Open Conference

References 

Premier Volleyball League (Philippines)
2022 in Philippine sport
2023 in volleyball
2023 in women's volleyball
Current volleyball seasons
February 2023 sports events in the Philippines
March 2023 sports events in the Philippines